Eddie Davis (born 4 October 1951, in Dillon, South Carolina, USA) was a professional light heavyweight boxer. Overall, he compiled a record of 34 wins (20 by knockout), 6 losses, and 1 draw.

Davis started his career by knocking out fellow boxer Otis Gordon in two rounds.  His star rose with five more wins, but this streak ended with a draw with Mario Rosa.  He won four more fights, but then lost to future champion Marvin Johnson and was knocked out by Pete McIntyre.

He lost in his first title fight to Dwight Qawi.  Subsequently, he fought twice more for the world title, but lost to the undefeated Michael Spinks in 1984, on points, and later to Don Lalonde, by knockout. His loss to Don was his last fight.

Professional boxing record

|-
|align="center" colspan=8|34 Wins (20 knockouts, 14 decisions), 6 Losses (5 knockouts, 1 decision), 1 Draw 
|-
| align="center" style="border-style: none none solid solid; background: #e3e3e3"|Result
| align="center" style="border-style: none none solid solid; background: #e3e3e3"|Record
| align="center" style="border-style: none none solid solid; background: #e3e3e3"|Opponent
| align="center" style="border-style: none none solid solid; background: #e3e3e3"|Type
| align="center" style="border-style: none none solid solid; background: #e3e3e3"|Round
| align="center" style="border-style: none none solid solid; background: #e3e3e3"|Date
| align="center" style="border-style: none none solid solid; background: #e3e3e3"|Location
| align="center" style="border-style: none none solid solid; background: #e3e3e3"|Notes
|-align=center
|Loss
|
|align=left| Donny "Golden Boy" Lalonde
|TKO
|2
|27/11/1987
|align=left| Port-of-Spain, Trinidad and Tobago
|align=left|
|-
|Win
|
|align=left| Tim Bullock
|TKO
|9
|26/09/1986
|align=left| Atlantic City, New Jersey, United States
|align=left|
|-
|Win
|
|align=left| Jack Johnson
|UD
|10
|26/06/1986
|align=left| Atlantic City, New Jersey, United States
|align=left|
|-
|Win
|
|align=left| Kelvin "Special K" Kelly
|PTS
|10
|25/04/1986
|align=left| Stateline, Nevada, United States
|align=left|
|-
|Win
|
|align=left| Arthel "Bam Bam" Lawhorne
|UD
|10
|28/02/1986
|align=left| Atlantic City, New Jersey, United States
|align=left|
|-
|Win
|
|align=left| Arthel "Bam Bam" Lawhorne
|DQ
|6
|17/10/1985
|align=left| Atlantic City, New Jersey, United States
|align=left|
|-
|Loss
|
|align=left| Marvin Johnson
|TKO
|5
|21/04/1985
|align=left| Atlantic City, New Jersey, United States
|align=left|
|-
|Win
|
|align=left| Rudy Robles
|KO
|3
|08/12/1984
|align=left| Phoenix, Arizona, United States
|align=left|
|-
|Win
|
|align=left| Chris Schwenke
|KO
|4
|17/07/1984
|align=left| SeaTac, Washington, United States
|align=left|
|-
|Loss
|
|align=left| Michael "Jinx" Spinks
|UD
|12
|25/02/1984
|align=left| Atlantic City, New Jersey, United States
|align=left|
|-
|Win
|
|align=left| Chris Schwenke
|TKO
|5
|13/12/1983
|align=left| Seattle, Washington, United States
|align=left|
|-
|Win
|
|align=left| Dale Grant
|UD
|12
|24/08/1983
|align=left| Creswell, Oregon, United States
|align=left|
|-
|Win
|
|align=left| "King" James Williams
|TKO
|8
|13/05/1983
|align=left| Des Moines, Iowa, United States
|align=left|
|-
|Win
|
|align=left| "King" James Williams
|UD
|10
|11/02/1983
|align=left| Eugene, Oregon, United States
|align=left|
|-
|Loss
|
|align=left| "Camden Buzzsaw" Dwight Muhammad Qawi
|TKO
|11
|20/11/1982
|align=left| Atlantic City, New Jersey, United States
|align=left|
|-
|Win
|
|align=left| Murray Sutherland
|TKO
|6
|11/06/1982
|align=left| Las Vegas, Nevada, United States
|align=left|
|-
|Win
|
|align=left| "Prince" Charles Smith
|KO
|2
|23/05/1982
|align=left| Las Vegas, Nevada, United States
|align=left|
|-
|Win
|
|align=left| Don Addison
|TKO
|4
|14/04/1982
|align=left| White Plains, New York, United States
|align=left|
|-
|Win
|
|align=left| Pablo Paul Ramos
|UD
|10
|28/11/1981
|align=left| Stateline, Nevada, United States
|align=left|
|-
|Win
|
|align=left| Jesse Avila
|KO
|6
|18/07/1981
|align=left| Las Vegas, Nevada, United States
|align=left|
|-
|Win
|
|align=left| Chris "Deep" Wells
|TKO
|5
|17/05/1981
|align=left| Atlantic City, New Jersey, United States
|align=left|
|-
|Win
|
|align=left| Michael Hardin
|KO
|7
|24/04/1981
|align=left| White Plains, New York, United States
|align=left|
|-
|Loss
|
|align=left| Pete McIntyre
|KO
|2
|27/09/1980
|align=left| Inglewood, California, United States
|align=left|
|-
|Win
|
|align=left| Curtis Goins
|KO
|7
|25/05/1980
|align=left| Atlantic City, New Jersey, United States
|align=left|
|-
|Win
|
|align=left| Johnny Wilburn
|TKO
|8
|09/05/1980
|align=left| Commack, New York, United States
|align=left|
|-
|Win
|
|align=left| Willie Ray Taylor
|UD
|8
|23/02/1980
|align=left| Atlantic City, New Jersey, United States
|align=left|
|-
|Win
|
|align=left| Mike Tarasewich
|KO
|1
|19/10/1979
|align=left| Commack, New York, United States
|align=left|
|-
|Win
|
|align=left| "King" George Aidoo
|KO
|3
|03/08/1979
|align=left| Hempstead, New York, United States
|align=left|
|-
|Win
|
|align=left| Luis Guzman
|MD
|8
|29/06/1979
|align=left| New York City, United States
|align=left|
|-
|Loss
|
|align=left| Marvin Johnson
|KO
|7
|03/04/1978
|align=left| Indianapolis, Indiana, United States
|align=left|
|-
|Win
|
|align=left| Luis "Pudge" Rodriguez
|PTS
|10
|27/01/1978
|align=left| Hempstead, New York, United States
|align=left|
|-
|Win
|
|align=left| Mario Rosa
|PTS
|10
|27/08/1977
|align=left| Hempstead, New York, United States
|align=left|
|-
|Win
|
|align=left| "Cowboy" Bob Stewart
|TKO
|4
|08/04/1977
|align=left| Syracuse, New York, United States
|align=left|
|-
|Win
|
|align=left| Jose Elias
|PTS
|8
|18/01/1977
|align=left| Sunnyside, Queens, New York, United States
|align=left|
|-
|Draw
|
|align=left| Mario Rosa
|PTS
|10
|05/11/1976
|align=left| Sunnyside, Queens, New York, United States
|align=left|
|-
|Win
|
|align=left| Sixto Martinez
|KO
|3
|02/06/1976
|align=left| Uniondale, New York, United States
|align=left|
|-
|Win
|
|align=left| DC Walker
|PTS
|6
|31/03/1976
|align=left| Uniondale, New York, United States
|align=left|
|-
|Win
|
|align=left| Carlos Espada
|KO
|1
|24/01/1976
|align=left| Commack, New York, United States
|align=left|
|-
|Win
|
|align=left| Leonardo Rodgers
|DQ
|2
|28/11/1975
|align=left| Commack, New York, United States
|align=left|
|-
|Win
|
|align=left| Al Ware
|KO
|1
|17/10/1975
|align=left| Commack, New York, United States
|align=left|
|-
|Win
|
|align=left| Otis Gordon
|KO
|2
|12/09/1975
|align=left| Commack, New York, United States
|align=left|
|}

References

Light-heavyweight boxers
People from Dillon, South Carolina
Boxers from South Carolina
1951 births
Living people
American male boxers